Van Leigh Tiffin (born September 6, 1965) is a former American football placekicker.

Early life and education
Van Leigh Tiffin was born in Tupelo, Mississippi. He lived in Red Bay, Alabama, and attended Red Bay High School, attracting notice for his football ability.

College career 
Tiffin attended the University of Alabama where he was the Alabama Crimson Tide's primary placekicker from 1983-1986. He holds the school record for longest converted field goal, with a successful 57-yard attempt against Texas A&M in 1985. He held the school record for converting 135 extra point attempts until his son, Leigh Tiffin, broke it in 2009 by one; Van never missed, however, going 135 for 135, while Leigh required 142 attempts.

Tiffin's most notable kick came in the 1985 Iron Bowl against in-state rival Auburn. His 52-yard field goal lifted the Crimson Tide to a 25–23 victory as time expired. It has become part of Alabama lore, known mainly as "The Kick."

In 1986, Tiffin was named to the College Football All-America Team.

Professional career 
Tiffin spent one season in the National Football League, with the Miami Dolphins and Tampa Bay Buccaneers.

References

External links 
 Van Tiffin at NFL.com
 Van Tiffin statistics at Pro-Football-Reference.com

1965 births
Living people
American football placekickers
Alabama Crimson Tide football players
Miami Dolphins players
People from Red Bay, Alabama
National Football League replacement players
Tampa Bay Buccaneers players